Graphogaster is a genus of flies in the family Tachinidae.

Species
G. alaskensis (Brooks, 1942)
G. alberta (Curran, 1927)
G. brunnea (Brooks, 1942)
G. brunnescens Villeneuve, 1907
G. buccata Herting, 1971
G. deceptor (Curran, 1927)
G. dispar (Brauer & von Bergenstamm, 1889)
G. fuscisquamis (Brooks, 1942)
G. grandis (Brooks, 1942)
G. macdunnoughi (Brooks, 1942)
G. nigrescens Herting, 1971
G. nigrisquamata Tschorsnig, 1989
G. nuda (Brooks, 1942)
G. orientalis (Brooks, 1942)
G. parvipalpis Kugler, 1974
G. pollinosa (Brooks, 1942)
G. pseudonuda (Brooks, 1942)
G. psilocorsiphaga (Brooks, 1942)
G. slossonae (Townsend, 1916)
G. vestita Rondani, 1868

References

Tachininae
Tachinidae genera
Taxa named by Camillo Rondani